Acer heldreichii is a species of maple in the flowering plant family Sapindaceae.  Commonly called Balkan maple, Greek maple, Heldreich's maple, or mountain maple the species is native to the Balkan Peninsula east along the southern and eastern coasts of the Black Sea. 

References

External links
 Plant Systematics photo

heldreichii
Plants described in 1856
Flora of Southeastern Europe
Taxa named by Theodoros G. Orphanides
Taxa named by Pierre Edmond Boissier